107th Street is a commuter rail station on Metra Electric's main branch in the Pullman neighborhood of Chicago.

The station consists of a wooden platform between the tracks over a bridge with street-level connections. No parking is available at the station; however, there is a connection to two of the Chicago Transit Authority's bus routes.

Bus connections
CTA

  4 Cottage Grove 
  115 Pullman/115th

References

External links

107th Street entrance from Google Maps Street View

Metra stations in Chicago
Former Illinois Central Railroad stations